Daizong is the temple name used for several emperors of China. It may refer to:

Emperor Daizong of Tang (727–779, reigned 762–779), emperor of the Tang dynasty
Jingtai Emperor (1428–1457, reigned 1449–1457), emperor of the Ming dynasty

See also
Dai Zong, a fictional Song dynasty hero from the Chinese novel Water Margin
Taizong (disambiguation)

Temple name disambiguation pages